Sakada is the first solo album by ex-Crimson Glory frontman Midnight.

Track listing

Personnel 
 Midnight - Vocals, acoustic guitar
 Scott Gibson - Electric guitars, bass, acoustic guitar
 Phil Anderson - Drums and percussion, washboard, maracas and hammered dulcimer
 Ben Jackson - Bass (Track 2)
 Matte Wuole - Electric guitar (Tracks 2, 3 & 8)
 Dave Talkovic - Bass (Tracks 5 & 8)
 Keith S. Coker - Flute (Track 9)
 Dave Steele - Banjo (Track 5)
 Ronny Czyrny - Acoustic guitar (Track 9)
 Gerd Woelk - Bass (Track 9)

References

Midnight (musician) albums
2005 debut albums